The Vivir Mi Vida World Tour was a concert tour by American singer-songwriter Marc Anthony. The tour, in support of his album 3.0, is promoted by Cardenas Marketing Network. The tour was sponsored by Corona Extra. The opening acts were Arcangel and comedian Johnny Vega (New York). The first two shows sold out.

Setlist
This Setlist represents the setlist of the September 1, 2013 show in Long Island, New York at Nassau Coliseum.

"I Need to Know"
"Y Hubo Alguien"
"Hasta Ayer"
"Valió la Pena"
"Volando Entre Tus Brazos"
"Contra La Corriente"
"Y Como Es El"
"Vivir Lo Nuestro"
"Que Precio Tiene El Cielo"
"Hasta Que Te Conocí"
"Te Conozco Bien"
"Mi Gente"

Encore
"Tu Amor Me Hace Bien"
"Vivir Mi Vida"

Tour dates

References

2013 concert tours
Marc Anthony concert tours